Yolanda of Courtenay (c. 1200 – June 1233), was a Queen of Hungary as the second wife of King Andrew II of Hungary.

Yolanda was the daughter of Count Peter II of Courtenay and his second wife, Yolanda of Flanders, the sister of Baldwin I and Henry I, the Emperors of Constantinople. Her marriage with King Andrew II, whose first wife, Gertrude had been murdered by conspirators on 28 September 1213, was arranged by her uncle, the Emperor Henry I.

Their marriage was celebrated in February 1215 in Székesfehérvár and John, Archbishop of Esztergom crowned her queen consort. However, Bishop Robert of Veszprém sent a complaint to Pope Innocent III, because the coronation of the queens consort in Hungary had been traditionally the privilege of his see. The Pope sent a legate to Hungary in order to investigate the complaint and confirmed the privilege of the See of Veszprém.

Following her uncle's death on 11 July 1216, her husband was planning to acquire the imperial crown for himself, but the barons of the Latin Empire proclaimed her father emperor, instead.

Yolanda maintained good relations with her husband's children from his first marriage. Her husband survived her. She was buried in the Egres Abbey of the White Monks.

Marriages and children
By her marriage with Andrew II of Hungary (c. 1177 – 21 September 1235) she had:
 Yolanda (c. 1215 – 12 October 1251), wife of King James I of Aragon

Sources
 Soltész, István: Árpád-házi királynék (Gabo, 1999)
 Kristó, Gyula - Makk, Ferenc: Az Árpád-ház uralkodói (IPC Könyvek, 1996)

12th-century births
1233 deaths
Yolanda
Hungarian queens consort
Year of birth unknown
13th-century Hungarian people
13th-century Hungarian women
12th-century Hungarian people
12th-century Hungarian women
13th-century French people
13th-century French women
12th-century French people
12th-century French women